Andrew Place (born 18 December 1970) is an English former ice dancer who represented Great Britain. Skating with Lynn Burton and then Melanie Bruce, he became a two-time British national champion and competed at the 1992 Winter Olympics.  He now coaches at Planet Ice Silverdome Arena in Basingstoke.

Career 
Together with Lynn Burton, Place placed sixth at the 1988 World Junior Championships in Brisbane, Australia, and fourth at the 1989 World Junior Championships in Sarajevo, Yugoslavia. The following season, they moved up to the senior ranks and won the British national title. They went on to finish 12th at the 1990 European Championships in Leningrad, Soviet Union, and 17th at the 1990 World Championships in Halifax, Nova Scotia, Canada. They parted ways at the end of the season.

Later in 1990, Place teamed with Melanie Bruce. The duo won the national title in their second season together. They finished 17th at the 1992 European Championships in Lausanne, Switzerland; 17th at the 1992 Winter Olympics in Albertville, France; and 19th at the 1992 World Championships in Oakland, California, United States.

Place later joined forces with Clair Wileman. They won a pair of silver medals at the British Championships and finished 19th at the 1995 European Championships in Dortmund, Germany.

Results

With Wileman

With Bruce

With Burton

References

English male ice dancers
1970 births
Olympic figure skaters of Great Britain
Figure skaters at the 1992 Winter Olympics
Sportspeople from Leeds
Living people